The 2006 Hillingdon Council election took place on 4 May 2006 to elect members of Hillingdon London Borough Council in London, England. The whole council was up for election and the Conservative Party gained control of the council after gaining 14 seats overall, 9 from Labour and 5 from the Liberal Democrats.

Election result

|}

Ward results

Barnhill

Botwell

Brunel

Cavendish

Charville

Eastcote and East Ruislip

Harefield

Heathrow Villages

Hillingdon East

Ickenham

Manor

Northwood

Northwood Hills

Pinkwell

South Ruislip

Townfield

Uxbridge North

Uxbridge South

West Drayton

West Ruislip

Yeading

Yiewsley

References

2006
2006 London Borough council elections